The 2014-15 Czech 1. liga season was the 21st season of the Czech 1. liga, the second level of ice hockey in the Czech Republic. 14 teams participated in the league.

Piráti Chomutov and ČEZ Motor České Budějovice have won this season of the league, with Chomutov later succeeding in the Extraliga qualification, thus being promoted to the league for the following season. They have been replaced by HC Slavia Praha, who have been relegated to the 1. Liga after 20 straight seasons in the Extraliga.

HC Rebel Havlíčkův Brod was relegated to the Czech 2. liga after almost 9 years in the league, having been plagued by financial difficulties during the entirety of the season. They have been replaced by HC ZUBR Přerov, who have been promoted from the 2. Liga.

Format 
14 teams compete in the league, with the top 6 teams at the end of the regular season play qualifying for the playoffs. The teams that finish 7th through 10th play a play-in series (best-of-five) to determine who will join the top six into the playoff quarter-finals (best-of-seven). No final is played. Instead, two teams which win the semifinals are declared co-champions and both advance to the qualifying group against two worst placed teams at the end of the Extraliga regular season.

The four lowest ranked teams (11–14) after the regular season play in a play-out group (12 games, all regular-season matches are counted into the ranking). The worst team after 12 rounds is relegated to the Czech 2. Liga.

Regular season

Playoffs

2015-16 Extraliga qualification 

Piráti Chomutov have been promoted to the Extraliga for the 2015-16 season.

HC Olomouc have qualified for the 2015-16 Czech Extraliga season

HC Slavia Praha have been relegated to the Czech 1. Liga for the 2015–16 season, after 21 straight seasons in the Extraliga.

ČEZ Motor České Budějovice failed to qualify for the 2015-16 Czech Extraliga season. They will resume playing in the Czech 1. Liga.

Play-out 

*- the final game between HC Rebel Havlíčkův Brod and HC Most was cancelled.

HC Rebel Havlíčkův Brod was relegated.

2014–15 in Czech ice hockey leagues
Czech 1. Liga seasons
2014–15 in European second tier ice hockey leagues